Home Island is an island off of the east coast of Labrador.

References

Uninhabited islands of Newfoundland and Labrador